Baizhou or Bai Prefecture was a zhou (prefecture) in imperial China in modern southern Guangxi, China. It existed intermittently from 623 to 1136, and between 742 and 758 it was known as Nanchang Commandery.

Counties
Bai Prefecture administered the following counties (縣) through history:
Bobai (博白), roughly modern Bobai County. 
Nanchang (南昌) 
Jianning (建寧)
Zhouluo (周羅)
Nanchang, Jianning, and Zhouluo, all abolished by the Song dynasty in 972, are probably all in modern Bobai County.

References

 
 
 

Prefectures of the Tang dynasty
Prefectures of Southern Han
Guangnan West Circuit
Former prefectures in Guangxi
623 establishments
7th-century establishments in China
1130s disestablishments in Asia
12th-century disestablishments in China